Orange Jackets is the oldest service organization for women and non-binary folks at the University of Texas at Austin. The group was founded in 1923 as a women's honorary service organization, named for their distinctive orange vests. As the official hosts of the university, Orange Jackets is one of the most prestigious and esteemed women's organizations at the university. The core tenets are excellence in service, leadership, and scholarship. The organization is composed of women and non-binary leaders from all majors and various facets of campus life. Orange Jackets is an inclusive organization that has members from all backgrounds, cultures, majors, and abilities. Orange Jackets is set apart for its dedication to service of the campus community and to the empowerment of young women leaders at the University of Texas.

Accomplishments 
The Orange Jackets are known for their volunteer efforts and service projects on campus and in the community. Orange Jackets' primary philanthropy is The Settlement Home for Children in Austin. They are responsible for founding Family Weekend in 1924, originally Dad's and Mother's Day. In 1926, they started the Women's Self Government Association, a now-retired governance body, which addressed women's issues in college environments. Other notable contributions include the implementation of police call boxes across the university campus and starting fundraising efforts for Voices Against Violence, a UT program offering sexual assault counseling and education, after federal funding for the program was cut. The Orange Jackets began the initiative to erect the first female statue at the University of Texas. Barbara Jordan was selected because of her civil rights activism, political accomplishments, love for Texas, and connection to the University. The Barbara Jordan statue remains a symbol of women's presence and power on the university campus.

Roles and Responsibilities 
As official hosts of the university, Orange Jackets are called upon to host special guests and donors on campus. The Orange Jackets are also one of many student organizations allowed on the field during UT football games. Members of Orange Jackets are easily recognized at campus events by their burnt orange vests emblazoned with a white “T” on the side pocket. Orange Jackets have been sporting this uniform ever since the UT v. OU game that took place on November 17, 1923. Every person who becomes an Orange Jacket receives their vest at the end of their Tappee year. Texas Orange Jackets is a revered organization of young women leaders dedicated to the improvement of their university.

Notable alumnae
 Liz Carpenter
 Lady Bird Johnson
 Florence Shapiro
 Carole Keeton Strayhorn
 Karen Elliott House
 Margaret C. Berry
 Wande (rapper)

References

External links
 Orange Jackets

University of Texas at Austin
Student organizations established in 1923
1923 establishments in Texas